Leadfinger (pron: Led-finger) are an Australian guitar rock band formed in the city of Wollongong, New South Wales, in 2006 by Glasgow-born singer/guitarist Stewart 'Leadfinger' Cunningham. The band has released 6 albums to date, with the most recent coming out in February 2022 through Golden Robot Records.

Background 

Leadfinger founder Stewart Cunningham has been a fixture in the Australian underground music scene for over 20 years. He first plied his trade as guitarist with pre-grunge Wollongong band The Proton Energy Pills. In the late 1980s, he then headed to Sydney where he spent the 1990s playing in seminal underground guitar bands – Asteroid B-612, Brother Brick and Challenger-7. He also had a stint in Melbourne with The Yes-Men, a band formed by Sean Greenway (ex-God and The Freeloaders). All of these bands released critically appreciated albums in Australia, the United States, Japan and Europe.

Upon returning to live near hometown Wollongong in 2005, Cunningham began performing live as 'Leadfinger', relying on open tuning and slide guitar driven songs. The first three Leadfinger albums were released through Bang! Records, a Spanish Basque independent label that specialises in underground Australian rock like The Beasts of Bourbon, The Scientists and The Drones. The band's most recent album No Room at the Inn, came out through iconic Australian Label Citadel Records whose legacy stretches back 30 years and roster includes many of Leadfinger's own musical influences including Deniz Tek, Died Pretty and the Lime Spiders.

The name 'leadfinger' was originally a pen name for Stewart Cunningham and originates from when his brother shot him with an air rifle at age 14. The lead pellet from the air rifle became embedded in his left index finger and required surgery to remove. Future bandmates would take to calling Cunningham 'leadfinger' in jest that the bizarre air rifle injury had somehow come to influence his guitar style.  Cunningham himself states that the name Leadfinger was also chosen for his new project as an homage to delta blues legend Lead Belly, his original intention being to perform solo under the name. Cunningham continues a great tradition of Scottish Australian rock musicians and songwriters in Australia following in the steps of the Young family (members of AC/DC, The Easybeats), Jimmy Barnes, Bon Scott, Colin Hay, Karl Broadie, James McCann and others.

Music 

Leadfinger dabble in a wide variety of styles but are mostly known for a combination of guitar driven high energy rock, power pop and 70s punk rock, similar to The Replacements, Radio Birdman and The Saints. Leadfinger mine the deep seam of underground guitar music back through the 70s rock and punk era's to the classic Stones and Dylan records of the late 60s and beyond. Their tools are as broad as their musical palette; electric guitars, 12 and 6 string acoustic guitars, alternate tunings and slide, dynamic bass and drums and harmony vocals. Their music embodies a soulful and classic kind of rock and roll and is based around the songwriting of singer/guitarist Stewart Cunningham and the use of vintage gear and amplification.

History

2005–2008 (The Floating Life) 

After a 4-year hiatus from playing and writing music following the death of his Yes-Men bandmate, Sean Greenway in 2001 and the abrupt end of that band, Cunningham began writing again in 2005 and a new batch of songs was recorded primarily as demos in his home studio. These songs would eventually be compiled for release as the first Leadfinger album, 'the floating life' which came out in mid 2007 through Spanish based record label Bang! Records. The connection with Bang! Records came through that label's prior release of recordings by Cunningham's earlier bands Brother Brick, The Yes-Men and Asteroid B-612. The first ever Leadfinger gig took place at Wollongong's long standing underground venue The Oxford Tavern in February 2006 and featured in Cunningham's own words "...a musician used to playing with a band fumbling through a set of songs in a shocked and disjointed manner". By mid 2006 Cunningham was joined at a number of gigs by drummer Stephen O'Brien (ex- The Unheard). Finally at the Oxford Tavern on NYE 2006 the first full line-up of Leadfinger was completed with the addition of Wayne Stokes (ex-Thumlock) on electric bass guitar. This initial 3 piece line-up of Leadfinger would only play live sporadically in its time together, including the official launch gig for 'the floating life' album at the Hopetoun Hotel in Sydney on 29 July 2007. They managed to record a batch of new songs in two inspired sessions at an old farmhouse in the Tongarra dairy country below Macquarie Pass south of Wollongong. These recordings can be heard on the Through the Cracks CD EP (2008 – Musicfarmers Records) and the Rich Kids album (2009 –  Bang! Records). Both these releases were produced and mixed by Cunningham at his home studio, dubbed 'Leadfinger's Rendezvous Studio'. This first line up played its last gig at The Tote Hotel in Melbourne as part of the two night Bang! Records Festival on 15 August 2008.

2008 – 2009 (Rich Kids) 

The current and most well known Leadfinger line up came together in late 2008 with the addition of second guitarist Michael Boyle (ex-Mudlungs) and a new rhythm section of Adam 'Reggie' Screen on electric bass guitar and Dillon Hicks (ex-Zambian Goat Herders). on Drums. Although they played their first official gig at The Annandale Hotel in Sydney in January 2009, Hicks had previously filled in on Drums for some Leadfinger gigs in Melbourne in 2008 whilst Boyle had been playing with Cunningham in a duet format at smaller intimate gigs in the previous two years. With the culmination of this line up the band became a genuine going concern. A newfound camaraderie and commitment that was missing from the previous line up enabled the band to play live more regularly and pursue a more definite musical direction.

2009 finally saw a belated release of the Tongarra farmhouse recordings by the first Leadfinger line up. The album titled Rich Kids (after the album track Rich Kids Can't Play Rock'n’roll) was released on vinyl and cd again through Bang! Records. Critical reviews of the album were very positive. Of the album's title track Patrick Emery wrote via Australian Mess+Noise music website "...Rich Kids Can't Play Rock'n’Roll but Leadfinger can!" Rich Kids has a raw, distinctly Australian sound a la The Saints and Radio Birdman and contained two standout tracks that would become mainstays of the live set for years to come, namely Fade Your Brilliance and Rich Kids Can't Play Rock'n’Roll. Both formats of the album also include a cover of Bad Penny, a song written originally performed and written by Rory Gallagher whilst a version of I Think of Demons (originally by Roky Erickson) appears on the vinyl format. A version of The Saints song Ghost Ships appears on the CD release.

2010 – 2011 (We Make the Music) 

Over winter 2010 Leadfinger recorded album number 3 at Sydney's Big Jesus Burger Studio in Surry Hills, Sydney. With the help of JP Fung and Brent Williams (The New Christs) the band found themselves in a professional recording studio for the first time and made the most of it. We Make the Music was recorded using vintage analogue technology and 2" tape and then mixed on a vintage Neve desk. As a result, the sound of this album has great warmth and depth that harks back to great seventies era albums that are a strong influence on the band like Exile on Main Street by the Rolling Stones and Big Star's first two albums. We Make the Music was released in March 2011. The CD and digital version were released through Wollongong based record label Impedance Records whilst the vinyl version came out through Bang! Records. The album title and title track was inspired by a particular scene from the film Willy Wonka & the Chocolate Factory (starring Gene Wilder) and is a statement on the originality and the value of artistic inspiration over corporate and media manipulation. "We are the music makers and we are the dreamers of the dreams" was originally from an 1873 poem, Ode by Arthur O'Shaughnessy.

There was enough material recorded at the BJB sessions to make a double album and this was Cunningham's original intention but lack of enthusiasm for this idea from both labels meant that We Make the Music was the standard 12 tracks although the track list for each format is markedly different. The album Launch was at the Annandale Hotel on 19 May 2011 and it received many good reviews with Australian webzine the i-94 Bar declaring "This is a bona-fide Australian Classic".

The Remaining tracks from the sessions were released on a limited edition CD EP called I Belong to the Band in November 2011. Leadfinger also made two video clips for songs from the We Make the Music album, for the title track "We Make the Music" and the song "Fourteen" from the CD version of the album. Both clips were produced by Rob Stephenson.

2012 – 2015 (No Room at the Inn) 

In late 2011 Leadfinger began arranging and rehearsing a new batch of songs that would become album No. 4. The songs were mostly pre-written by Cunningham with many being inspired by an Epiphone acoustic 12 string guitar that had he had acquired in early 2011. Songs like The Wandering Man, Gimme the Future, Pretty Thing and The Other Ones that became the backbone of the album were all based on simple 3 chord progressions that were given a distinct tone and twist by the involvement of the 12 string sound. Having a very small budget the band had no option but to record something quick and inexpensively so the bed tracks were done at Sydney's Defwolf studio in late April 2012 whilst the overdubs, vocals and mixing were completed by Cunningham himself at his home studio, Leadfinger's Rendezvous Studio over the next few months. The resulting album No Room at the Inn was recorded and mastered for under $5,000. It is a true independent recording paid for and made by the band. The album was fortuitously picked up by iconic Australian record label Citadel Records and it received worthy critical acclaim upon release in February 2013.

Most great rock 'n’ roll is made out on the fringes but this latest album from Australian veteran Stewart 'Leadfinger' Cunningham packs such a punch that it deserves to come out from the underground. Fans of bands from The Masters' Apprentices to HITS will love its greasy swagger, sure-footed songwriting and a sound that's both rich and raw. This is a deep seam, back to the classic Stones records of the late '60s on songs like You're So Strange, with its gospel-charged backing vocal from Chloe West. Gimme The Future sports searing guitar work that threatens to shred speakers, and Cruel City pumps with the kind of intensity once found on Radio Birdman records. But there is also room for banjo on the dusty roads of the title tune, and the intense The Lonely Road is dedicated to Rory Gallagher. Anyone who ever heard the sparks flying on a record by the late Irish bluesman will recognise a soul brother in Leadfinger and his passionate tunes." (4 Stars) Noel Mengel, The Courier Mail, 20 April 2013To promote the album Leadfinger embarked on an Australian tour in March and April 2013 supporting fellow Citadel label mate and legendary Detroit-born musician Deniz Tek (ex- Radio Birdman/New Race).

 2016 – present (Friday Night Heroes) 

The band released their 5th album Friday Night Heroes on 14 July 2016. Recorded in mid-2015 in the now defunct Linear Recording Studio (Leichardt, NSW) with Wade Keighran of Wolf & Cub mixing and co-producing. The album was released through the now defunct Brisbane-based Conquest of Noise label on vinyl and CD. The band embarked on a ten date, 4 state Australian tour in July and August to promote the album.

In October 2017 Leadfinger played its first ever overseas gigs when the band played a 14 date European tour that included gigs in France, Switzerland and Spain.

 2017 – present (Silver & Black) 

After a long hiatus from playing live Leadfinger played its first gig in over three years at Marrickville Bowling Club in June 2021.

The band released their sixth album Silver & Black on 25th February 2022. Silver & Black was recorded in late 2020 at Garth Porter owned Rancom Street Studio (Botany, NSW) with Brent Clark producing. Silver & Black was released through the Sydney-based Golden Robot Records label on double 12" Vinyl, Digital and CD. The new album as received positive critical reviews, being hailed as the a 'Magnum Opus' by Col Gray writing for the  i-94 Bar underground music site...Top to bottom – every song on “Silver & Black” is a winner, each rich with colour and diversity. If you thought “Friday Night Heroes” was good, “Silver & Black” goes one step further, and stands as Leadfinger's magnum opus – and it should rightfully open new doors for the band. After more than four years – Leadfinger are back – rejuvenated, reinvigorated, and armed with a stunning collection of new rock ‘n’ roll songs. Special when lit and then some. Get on board." (5 Stars) Col Gray, 7 March 2022

The band played various dates in NSW, ACT and Victoria in 2022 to promote the release of the album.

Personnel 

2006–present: Stewart Cunningham (Lead vocals, acoustic & electric guitars, slide guitar, harmonica, mandolin)

2006–2008: Wayne Stokes – Bass guitar, Stephen O’Brien – Drums

2008–present: Dillon Hicks – Drums, Reggie Screen – Bass guitar, Michael Boyle – Electric Guitar/backing vocals

Discography of Leadfinger

Albums 

 The Floating Life (2007) Bang! Records
 Rich Kids (2009) Bang! Records
 We Make the Music (2011) Bang! Records/Impedance Records
 No Room at the Inn (2013) Citadel Records
 Friday Night Heroes (2016) Conquest of Noise
 Silver & Black (2022) Golden Robot Records

EP's & Singles 

 Through the Cracks (2008) Musicfarmers
 I Belong to the Band (2011) Impedance Records
 Ripped Genes/Analogue Dreams (2012) Unpopular Records (self-released by the band)
 Cheer Squad 7" Vinyl & Digital single (2016) Conquest of Noise
 La Banda en Espana (2019) Unpopular Records (self-released by the band)

Compilations 

 Just Like Fire Would, track on Let Me Turn You On (2012) Easy Action Records
 Left Wing Yule, track on Rock Against Bullshit Xmas Comp (2012) Rock Against Bullshit Records
 Swept Back, track on Up North/Down Under (2010) Bootleg Booze Records
 December Runaway, track on Rock Against Bullshit Xmas Comp (2010) Rock Against Bullshit Records

References

General 

  Note: Archived [on-line] copy has limited functionality.

Specific

External links 
 http://www.leadfinger.com.au/ 
 https://www.youtube.com/watch?v=Ysa_6AccOtk (Leadfinger – The Fall of Rome Clip, YouTube)
 https://goldenrobotrecords.com
 http://www.bang-records.net/ 
 http://conquestofnoise.com/
 http://www.i94bar.com/albums/no-room-at-the-inn-leadfinger-citadel 
 http://sonsofthedolls.blogspot.com.au/2011/09/brother-brick-portable-altamont.html
 

Musical groups established in 2006
Sydney
Australian indie rock groups
Australian people of Scottish descent